Geoff Bray (born 30 May 1951) is an English former footballer who played in the Football League for Oxford United, Swansea City and Torquay United.

External links

English footballers
English Football League players
Swansea City A.F.C. players
Oxford United F.C. players
Torquay United F.C. players
1951 births
Living people
Dartford F.C. players
Erith & Belvedere F.C. players
Association football forwards